Comitas thisbe is a species of sea snail, a marine gastropod mollusc in the family Pseudomelatomidae, the turrids and allies. 

Subspecies
 Comitas thisbe diomedea A.W.B. Powell, 1969 (East China Sea, the Philippines)

Description
The length of the shell attains 44 mm, its diameter 14 mm.

The dull white shell has a fusiform shape with turreted spire. It contains about  10 whorls (the upper ones of the apex are eroded). The chief characteristics of this species, represented by a unique specimen, are the smooth concavity at the upper part of the remaining whorls, exhibiting only very delicate lines of growth and faint traces of spiral striae, the numerous slender oblique costae upon the lower two thirds of each whorl, and the distinct close wavy striae on and between the ribs. These are nineteen in number upon the penultimate volution, thickest at their upper ends, obliquely curved, attenuated below, and only just reach to the suture. The broadly capacious body whorl is, excepting in the concavity above, delicately wavy striated throughout. It is excavated over the neck to a slightly flexed, rather short, unnotched anterior canal. The aperture is elongate and pear-shaped. The outer lip is tenuous, rather widely sinuate and prominently arcuate in the middle. The columella is curved in the middle with below a slight callus.

Distribution
This marine species occurs off Sri Lanka

References

External links
 Biolib.cz: Comitas thisbe
 

thisbe
Gastropods described in 1906